Somoskőújfalu is a village in Nógrád County, Northern Hungary Region, Hungary.

References

Populated places in Nógrád County